Alcivar is a surname. Notable people with the surname include:

Bob Alcivar (born 1938), American keyboardist and music producer
Jim Alcivar, American keyboardist and sound engineer
Patricia Alcivar (born 1977), American boxer